The Irish Open is a WDF darts tournament held in Killarney, first established in 2008. It is jointly held with the Irish Classic during the same weekend.

Irish Open

Men's

Women's

Boys

Girls

References
 https://mastercaller.com/tournaments/irish-open-men

Darts tournaments
Sports competitions in the Republic of Ireland